Last Gasp or The Last Gasp may refer to

 Last Gasp (publisher)
 Last Gasp (Inside No. 9), a TV episode
 The Last Gasp, a 2007 album by Impaled
 The Last Gasp (novel)
 "Last Gasp" (song)
 Synonym for Dying gasp feature in telecoms